Stefan Banach was a Polish mathematician who made key contributions to mathematics. This article contains some of the things named in his memory.

Mathematics
 Banach algebra
 Amenable Banach algebra
 Banach Jordan algebra
 Banach function algebra
Banach *-algebra
Banach algebra cohomology
 Banach bundle
Banach bundle (non-commutative geometry)
Banach fixed-point theorem
Banach game
Banach lattice
 Banach limit
 Banach manifold
 Banach measure
 Banach space
Banach coordinate space
Banach disks
Banach norm
 Banach–Alaoglu theorem
Banach–Mazur compactum
Banach–Mazur game
Banach–Mazur theorem
Banach–Ruziewicz problem
Banach-Saks theorem
 Banach-Schauder theorem
Banach–Steinhaus theorem
Banach–Stone theorem
 Banach–Tarski paradox
 Banach's matchbox problem
 Hahn–Banach theorem

Other
 16856 Banach
Banach Journal of Mathematical Analysis 
International Stefan Banach Prize
Stefan Banach Medal

See also

Banach